Lochmaeocles hondurensis is a species of beetle in the family Cerambycidae. It was described by Dillon and Dillon in 1946. It is known from Honduras.

References

hondurensis
Beetles described in 1946